Vive L'Empereur! is an historical painting made retrospectively by French artist Édouard Detaille in 1891, based upon the cavalry charge of the French 4th Hussars during the Battle of Friedland. The actual battle had taken place on 14 June 1807, some 41 years before the artist's birth.

History
The painting was purchased by the Art Gallery of New South Wales in 1893, where it still remains. In 1959, the painting was damaged severely by water, but it was restored during the 2000s.

Museum
In June 2014, the Art Gallery of New South Wales purchased Portrait of Édouard Detaille  by Basile Lemeunier (1852–1922), which shows Detaille at work in his studio – painting Vive L'Empereur! – atop a wooden ladder with a lit cigarette in his mouth. The portrait was exhibited at the Paris Salon in 1891.

References

External links

1891 paintings
Paintings by Édouard Detaille
Collections of the Art Gallery of New South Wales
Horses in art
War paintings